The following is a list of episodes of the British television series Danger Man.

Series overview

Episodes
Episodes were usually not aired in production order. Broadcast order varied widely between the UK and US. In fact, CBS, the US broadcaster, used it only as a summer replacement for Wanted: Dead or Alive and did not air even half of the run.

Although aired over the course of 18 months, the first 39 episodes are considered one series.

Series 1 (1960–62)
Airdate is for ATV London  ITV regions varied date and order.

Series 2 (1964–65)
Series 2 and 3 were broadcast as Danger Man in the UK and Secret Agent in the US. Airdate is for ATV Midlands,. ITV regions varied date and order.

Series 3 (1965–66)
Some books list episodes 3-1 to 3–10 as part of series 2 due to change of studio from 3–11. Airdates are again as for ATV Midlands.

Series 4 (1968)
Airdates are for ATV Midlands. ATV London broadcast on 19 February and 26 February 1967 respectively.

These two episodes, which were shot in colour, were broadcast in the US as the European cinema movie version, Koroshi. The show's abrupt cancellation, to make way for production and broadcast of star Patrick McGoohan's The Prisoner, resulted in these final two shows airing in the UK early in 1968, when they were broadcast as fill-in episodes for The Prisoner which had fallen behind the scheduled UK transmission dates, replacing advertised Prisoner episodes that were not yet ready for broadcast. They were originally intended to be broadcast after the finale of The Prisoner in the UK. Some parts of the UK, as well as the US, never saw the episodes in their original form until their DVD release.

References

Danger Man
Danger Man